Stephen (I) from the kindred Gutkeled (died 1259) was a Hungarian influential lord, an early prominent member of the gens Gutkeled and ancestor of its Majád branch. He governed the Duchy of Styria on behalf of claimants Duke Béla and Duke Stephen from 1254 until his death.

Origin and family relations

Stephen was born into the Gutkeled kindred, a widely extended clan of German origin, which came from the Duchy of Swabia to the Kingdom of Hungary during the reign of Peter in the mid-11th century, according to Simon of Kéza's Gesta Hunnorum et Hungarorum. Stephen's father was a certain comes Dragun from the clan's Sárvármonostor branch. Powerful barons Nicholas I and Apaj Gutkeled were Dragun's cousins however all of their ancestors can not be identified thus there is inability to connect the Sárvármonostor branch to the other branches of the clan. Stephen was the only known son of Dragun.

He is considered as forefather and first member of the Majád branch. He had four sons from his unidentified wife: Nicholas II, Joachim, Stephen II and Paul. All of them held important positions, e.g. Judge royal, Master of the treasury, Judge royal and Ban of Severin, respectively. Through his youngest son Paul, Stephen was also an ancestor of the Majádi, Butkai, Keszeg de Butka, Márki, Málcai, Csatári, Ráskai, Fejes de Ráska and Vidfi de Ráska noble families.

Joachim, his second son was one of the most infamous early oligarchs during the chaotic reign of Ladislaus IV in the 1270s. He even kidnapped the young Ladislaus and established a dominion in Slavonia, excluding the royal power. Following his death in 1277, his province was divided between the Kőszegis and Babonići, thus the Majád branch declined while other branches of the Gutkeled clan (for instance Rakamaz branch, where the prestigious Báthory family originated) has become increasingly important.

Career in Hungary
Stephen started his political career at the ducal court of Andrew, Prince of Halych, the youngest son of King Andrew II, where he served between 1231 and 1234. When the young prince died without child in 1234, Stephen left the Principality of Halych. Following the death of King Andrew II in the next year, he became a loyal supporter of Béla IV, who ascended the Hungarian throne in 1235. When the Mongols raided Hungary in 1241, Stephen had participated in the Battle of Mohi where the Hungarian royal army suffered a catastrophic defeat against Batu Khan's troops. He was able to flee from the battlefield and later joined the companion of the escaping Béla IV who fled to Dalmatia after a short and unfortune bypass in the Duchy of Austria.

After the death of William of Saint Omer, the King's distant relative, Stephen was appointed Master of the horse around August 1242. He held the dignity until at least October 1244, but there is a non-authentic charter which suggests he served in that capacity until 1245. Beside that Stephen also functioned as ispán/župan of Vrbas (or Orbász) County from 1243 to 1244/5, otherwise he is the first known noble, who held that ispánate in Lower Slavonia. From 1245 to 1246, he served as Judge royal and ispán of Nyitra County.

In 1246, he was appointed Palatine of Hungary by Béla IV, replacing Denis Türje. He functioned in that position until 1247 or 1248. During that time, in 1246, he also governed Somogy County. Three charters preserved that Stephen judged in Bela, Szántó (Zala County) and Baksa (Baranya County) over litigation cases. From the 1230s, the monarchs occasionally entrusted the palatines, along with other barons of the realm, with specific tasks. For instance, Stephen Gutkeled and ispán Csák Hahót ordered to destroy mills built without permission on the river Rába on Béla IV's orders.

Governor of Slavonia and Styria
In 1248, Stephen became Ban of Slavonia, a position which he held for an 11-year term, until his death. He adopted the title of dux in 1254. His proper title was "Ban and Duke of Slavonia", according to a royal charter issued in 1254. Following the Mongol invasion, the province of Slavonia and Croatia had an important function of border defense, as a result the royal title of Duke of Slavonia was transformed into the hands of powerful secular barons, like Denis Türje and Stephen Gutkeled, while the King's son, Duke Stephen was still a minor. In Slavonia, Stephen acted as Béla's viceroy, according to a royal charter in 1248. Under Stephen's term, more and more sources identified the river Drava as the northeastern border of the Banate of Slavonia, but this was not a strict political boundary since the territories of southern Transdanubian counties (Zala, Somogy and Baranya) extended beyond the river line. Stephen resided in Zagreb and governed the region from his palace there, where he also had an own ducal court. He built up a vassal system in Slavonia, royal servants and familiaris were among his household. In 1256, Benedict, the Canon of Zagreb represented Stephen in the mintage and chamber at Pakrac.

Nevertheless, Ban Stephen was embroiled in conflict with several Dalmatian towns during his decade of rule, for instance, his son Ban Nicholas Gutkeled commemorated an event, when his father unlawfully usurped lands from the town of Trogir. Following the sudden death of Ugrin Csák, Archbishop of Split, King Béla IV installed Stephen as comes (ispán or župan) of Split in 1249, who thus became the supreme representative of secular affairs of the royal power in Dalmatia. Stephen temporarily handed over the title of comes of Split to a certain Mihailo in 1251; he reassumed control of the city's administration from 1252 to 1258. Stephen is last referred to as comes of Split in September 1258. Stephen was also styled as comes of Trogir at least since 1253. He bore that title at least until 1257. Since 1259, certain Alexander and Butko (Butheco) appeared as bans of the maritime provinces (i.e. Dalmatia), implying Stephen's retirement from the region shortly before his death.

Stephen built several castles (including Jablanac) along the borders as part of Béla's radical reforms introduced after the Mongol invasion. He also resettled with hospites ("guests" or "foreigners") the town of Križevci and donated privileges to the newly inhabited settlement. Stephen was the first secular landowner in Hungary, who founded a settlement, when he settled down the inhabitants of the Rab Island to along the walls of the Jablanac Castle in 1251. Stephen granted the same privileges to its burghers as the people of Trogir, Šibenik and other coastal cities in Dalmatia (for instance, the free elect of comes, the local superior, exemption from customs duties and restricting external immigration).

Béla IV, in accordance with a treaty in Pressburg (today Bratislava in Slovakia), acquired the Duchy of Styria from his rival Ottokar II of Bohemia on 1 May 1254 after a series of wars. Stephen Gutkeled was installed Captain of Styria in that year, while also maintained the dignity of Ban and Duke of Slavonia. He governed the occupied province from Pettau Castle (today Ptuj, Slovenia) on behalf of Béla, who adopted the title Duke of Styria, contesting Ottokar's claims. During his reign, Stephen supported the local church and the nobility in Lower Styria, but some of the nobility from Upper Styria also joined to his league by the end of 1256.

However, Stephen was unable to consolidate the Hungarian rule in Styria due to the Bohemians' counter-propaganda and activity. The Styrian noblemen rose up in rebellion against Stephen Gutkeled and routed him in early 1258. Stephen Gutkeled unsuccessfully besieged his former seat, Pettau in the first half of the year, defended by Seifried von Mahrenberg, who defeated the Hungarian troops. Ban Stephen could barely escape from the battlefield, when he swam across the Danube along with his horse. He had to flee Styria, however Béla and his son, Stephen jointly invaded Styria with mostly Cuman auxiliary troops, restored his suzerainty and Béla appointed his oldest son, Stephen as the new Duke of Styria. Their campaign was also connected to the war of succession between Philip of Carinthia and Ulrich of Seckau for the Archbishopric of Salzburg. Duke Stephen and his captain, Stephen Gutkeled launched a plundering raid in Carinthia in the spring of 1259, in retaliation of Duke Ulrich III of Carinthia's (brother of Archbishop Philip) support of the Styrian rebels. Following the death of Gutkeled, his position remained vacant and shortly thereafter the province lost for the Hungarians, when the Styrian lords sought assistance from Ottokar and vanquished the Hungarian army in the Battle of Kressenbrunn on 12 June 1260.

Stephen Gutkeled was also notable for the first Ban, who minted his own marten-adorned silver denarius in whole Slavonia, the so-called banovac or banski denar. The first coins were issued in 1255 by the Pakrac Chamber, according to a 1256 royal charter of Béla IV. Stephen's coins marked Styrian influence, as historian Bálint Hóman writes in his high-impact work in 1916. Later the mintage's seat moved from Pakrac to Zagreb by 1260. His banovac was considered a high quality currency and when the minting of golden coins began under Charles I of Hungary in 1323, Gutkeled's coins served as an example and base for the new florins. The self-coinage of the Ban of Slavonia (and Croatia) have persisted until the 1350s.

References

Sources

 
 
 

 
 
 
 

1259 deaths
13th-century Hungarian people
Stephen 01
Palatines of Hungary
Judges royal
Bans of Slavonia
People from the Duchy of Styria
Masters of the horse (Kingdom of Hungary)